Paratherina striata is a species of fish in the subfamily Telmatherininae, part of the rainbowfish family Melanotaeniidae. It is endemic to Indonesia where it occurs in Lakes Towuti, Wawontoa and Matano on the island of Sulawesi.

References

striata
Taxonomy articles created by Polbot
Fish described in 1935